Torments of the Night (German: Qualen der Nacht) is a 1926 German silent drama film directed by Curtis Bernhardt and starring Claire Rommer, Ernö Verebes and William Dieterle. It was distributed by the German subsidiary of the American company Fox Film.

Cast
 Claire Rommer as Minnie Hinrichsen  
 Ernö Verebes as Kurt Elversam  
 William Dieterle as Jap Geel  
 Fritz Rasp as Kellner  
 Alexander Granach as Murphy  
 Margarete Kupfer 
 Hermann Vallentin

References

Bibliography
 Hans-Michael Bock and Tim Bergfelder. The Concise Cinegraph: An Encyclopedia of German Cinema. Berghahn Books.

External links

1926 films
Films of the Weimar Republic
German silent feature films
Films directed by Curtis Bernhardt
German black-and-white films
German drama films
1926 drama films
Silent drama films
1920s German films
Fox Film films